Oluwatobiloba "Tobi" A. Adewole (born October 14, 1995) is an American professional soccer player who currently plays as a centre-back for RW Koblenz in the Regionalliga Südwest.

Career
Born in Cheverly, Maryland, Adewole played for various youth soccer clubs, namely Olney BGC, Bethesda SC, and Potomac SC. In 2013, Adewole enrolled at George Washington University, where he played for the college's soccer team, the George Washington Colonials. While at college, Adewole also played for the Jersey Express of the USL Premier Development League in 2016, playing four matches.

Pittsburgh Riverhounds
On January 9, 2017, Adewole signed a one-year deal with the Pittsburgh Riverhounds of the United Soccer League after impressing then-head coach Dave Brandt in an open trial.

Adewole made his professional debut on July 4, starting for the Riverhounds in their 1–3 loss against Charlotte Independence. The next season, on April 14, 2018, Adewole scored his first professional goal in a 1–0 victory over Ottawa Fury FC at Highmark Stadium.

During the 2019 season, Adewole started almost every match for the Riverhounds, forming a formidable partnership with Joseph Greenspan and Thomas Vancaeyezeele in defense. He scored his first goal of the season on March 23 against Swope Park Rangers, his 71st-minute goal being the equalizer in a 2–2 game.

In December 2019, it was announced that Adewole was out of contract with the Riverhounds.

Saint Louis FC
Prior to the 2020 season, Adewole joined another Championship club, Saint Louis FC. He made his debut for the club on July 11 in a 0–2 defeat against Indy Eleven. Adewole completed his season with Saint Louis FC with just 12 appearances.

Phoenix Rising
On December 1, 2020, Adewole signed with Championship club Phoenix Rising. He made his debut for the club on April 30, 2021 as a starter in a 4–1 victory over San Diego Loyal. After 9 games, Adewole and Phoenix Rising mutually agreed to part ways on September 8.

Indy Eleven
On September 24, 2021, Adewole was signed by Indy Eleven and made his club debut on September 29, 2021.

Colorado Springs Switchbacks
On April 22, 2022 signed with Colorado Springs Switchbacks.

RW Koblenz
Adewole signed with German Regionalliga Südwest side RW Koblenz in late July 2022.

International
Adewole is able to play for both the United States and Nigeria. In April 2018, he said "I want to play for Nigeria. I’m just 22 and believe I can contribute a lot to the national team."

Career statistics

Personal life
Adewole's parents were Nigerian immigrants who moved to Washington D.C. for work. His oldest brother, Tomi, played college soccer for the Villanova Wildcats and his sister, Teju, was a sprinter for the Princeton Tigers.

References

External links 
 USL Championship profile.

1995 births
Living people
Association football defenders
People from Cheverly, Maryland
American soccer players
Jersey Express players
Pittsburgh Riverhounds SC players
Saint Louis FC players
Phoenix Rising FC players
Indy Eleven players
Colorado Springs Switchbacks FC players
FC Rot-Weiß Koblenz players
Soccer players from Maryland
USL League Two players
USL Championship players
American expatriate soccer players
American expatriate soccer players in Germany